Francesco Ricci was a 17th-century Italian economist and mathematician from Palermo.

Works

References 

17th-century deaths
17th-century economists
17th-century Italian mathematicians
Italian economists
Scientists from Palermo